The Zambales Mountains is a mountain range on western Luzon island in the Philippines. The mountains separate Luzon's central plain from the South China Sea. Its most prominent section is known as the Cabusilan Mountain Range composed of Mount Pinatubo, Mount Negron and Mount Cuadrado, which are believed to be remnants of the ancestral Pinatubo peak.

Extent
The Zambales Mountains has an area of  extending North to South from the mountains of western Pangasinan province, the whole length of Zambales, to tip of the Bataan Peninsula in the south enclosing Manila Bay. The mountain range also encompasses the mountains in the municipalities of Bamban, Capas, San Jose, San Clemente, Mayantoc, Santa Ignacia, Camiling in the province of Tarlac. In Pampanga, it includes the mountains in Floridablanca, Porac, Lubao, Angeles City and Mabalacat.

Geology
The Zambales Mountains include Jurassic to Miocene ophiolite massifs, overlain by more recent sedimentary formation, including the Cagaluan Formation and the Santa Cruz Formation.

Volcanoes
Although the mountains are volcanic in origin, Mount Pinatubo is the only active volcano in the mountain range. Its eruption on June 15, 1991 was the second most powerful volcanic eruption of the 20th century after the 1912 eruption of Novarupta in Alaska. The volcanic eruption, which was complicated by the arrival of Typhoon Yunya, covered the region with thick volcanic ash and lahar including the U.S. military base at Clark Field near Angeles City.

Other volcanoes in Zambales Mountains are Mount Mariveles, Mount Natib and Mount Samat.

Protected areas
 Bataan National Park
 Manleluag Spring Protected Landscape
 Roosevelt Protected Landscape

Peaks

Zambales Mountains list of highest peaks by elevation 
 Mount Tapulao 
Mount Iba 5,430 ft (1,655 m)
 Mount Negron 
 Mount Pinatubo 
 Mount Mariveles 
 Mount Cuadrado 
Mount McDonald 
 Mount Natib 
 Mount Limay 
Mount Dorst 
Mount Samat 
Mount Gates

River System
List of rivers in Zambales Mountains by length.
 Tarlac River 
Camiling River 
Pasig - Potrero River 
 Bucao River 
 Santo Tomas River

See also
Geography of the Philippines

References

Mountain ranges of the Philippines
Landforms of Zambales